Pretty Green may refer to:

 The first track of the 1980 album Sound Affects by the Jam
 A clothing label originally fronted by Liam Gallagher, former frontman of English rock bands Oasis and Beady Eye, named after the song of the same name by the Jam. Now owned by JD Sports.
 "Pretty Green Eyes", a song by the act Force & Styles